Sclerobionts are collectively known as organisms living in or on any kind of hard substrate (Taylor and Wilson, 2003). A few examples of sclerobionts include Entobia borings, Gastrochaenolites borings, Talpina borings, serpulids, encrusting oysters, encrusting foraminiferans, Stomatopora bryozoans, and “Berenicea” bryozoans.

See also

Bioerosion

References
 

Biological processes
Ecology